Clupeosoma orientalalis is a species of moth of the family Crambidae. It is found in  Madagascar.

Viette placed this moth in a group with:
Autocharis librodalis  (Viette, 1958)
Autocharis phortalis  (Viette, 1958)

References

Odontiinae
Moths described in 1954
Moths of Madagascar
Moths of Africa